Matajer, meaning “shops” in Arabic, is a neighborhood shopping centre concept located in Sharjah, United Arab Emirates, developed by Sharjah Holding through a strategic partnership between the Government of Sharjah and Majid Al Futtaim Properties.

The first Matajer mall, Matajer Al Quoz, opened in October 2011 followed by three other branches, Al Juraina, Al Khan and Al Mirgab in 2012. Matajer malls recorded an annual footfall of over ten million across the four centres in 2012. Each Matajer location has a Gross Leasable Area (GLA) of between approximately 20,000 and 80,000 square feet.

Milestones
October 2011 – Matajer Al Quoz opened
May 2012 – Matajer Al Quoz was selected as a National award winner in the Leisure and Tourism Category at the MEED Quality Awards
July 2012 – Matajer Al Juraina opened
August 2012 – Matajer Al Khan and Matajer Al Mirgab opened

Entertainment
Magic Planet family entertainment centres are located in Matajer Al Juraina and Matajer Al Mirgab. The centres house a range of rides, arcade games and attractions for families.

References

External links
Matajer Mall - Official Website
Majid Al Futtaim Properties - Official Website
Sharjah Holding - Official Website

Sharjah (city)